"Help Wanted" is the first episode of the American animated television series SpongeBob SquarePants. It first aired on Nickelodeon in the United States on May 1, 1999, following the television broadcast of the 1999 Kids' Choice Awards. The episode follows the series' eponymous protagonist, an anthropomorphic young sea sponge, attempting to get a job at a local fast food restaurant called the Krusty Krab.

Series creator Stephen Hillenburg initially conceived the show in 1994, and began to work on it shortly after the cancellation of Rocko's Modern Life in 1996. To voice the character of SpongeBob, Hillenburg approached Tom Kenny, who had worked with him on Rocko's Modern Life. For the series pitch, Hillenburg originally wanted the idea of having SpongeBob and Squidward on a road trip, inspired by the 1989 film Powwow Highway. Hillenburg gave up the idea and started anew with the story he and Derek Drymon came up for "Help Wanted", based on an experience Hillenburg had in the Boy Scouts. The original idea would be used for the later episode "Pizza Delivery".

The episode was written by Hillenburg (who also functioned as storyboard director), storyboard artist Derek Drymon (who also functioned as the credited storyboard artist) and Tim Hill. The animation was directed by the show's supervising director, Alan Smart. "Help Wanted" also re-popularized the Tiny Tim cover "Livin' in the Sunlight, Lovin' in the Moonlight".

"Help Wanted" was excluded from the DVD release of the series' first season because Nickelodeon was unwilling to pay Tiny Tim's estate for using "Livin' in the Sunlight, Lovin' in the Moonlight", although it had since been released on other various DVDs of the series. "Help Wanted" was viewed in over 2 million households, receiving positive reviews from critics.

Plot

A French narrator introduces an aquatic city known as Bikini Bottom containing an ecstatic, hyperactive, optimistic, naive, and friendly sponge named SpongeBob SquarePants. SpongeBob gets ready to apply for a job as the fry cook at the Krusty Krab, much to the annoyance of the restaurant's cashier and SpongeBob's grumpy neighbor, an octopus named Squidward Tentacles. SpongeBob initially reconsiders his decision on the perceived count that he is not good enough, until his best friend, a starfish named Patrick Star, convinces him otherwise. Humored with SpongeBob's gullibility and enthusiasm, both Squidward and the restaurant's owner, a crab named Mr. Eugene Krabs, decide to manipulate SpongeBob by sending him on an impossible errand to purchase a seemingly rare, high-caliber spatula. The two believe Spongebob is unqualified, and conclude that he will not return.

Soon after Spongebob's departure, five buses containing ravenous anchovies stop at the Krusty Krab, all furiously demanding meals. Unable to satisfy the anchovies' hunger, Squidward and Mr. Krabs are left to deal with the unsatisfied crowd. The anchovies start piling up, forcing Squidward and Mr. Krabs to flee to the top of a support pole. Squidward and Mr. Krabs both believe that they are hopeless and about to be killed by the large mob. SpongeBob surprises the two by returning from his errand, having bought a spatula perfectly matching Mr. Krabs' specifications, which he uses to speedily cook Krabby Patties for all the anchovies. After the mob subsides, SpongeBob is officially welcomed as a Krusty Krab employee, much to Squidward's dismay. After Mr. Krabs leaves to count the day's profits, Patrick arrives and orders a Krabby Patty, and is hurled from the establishment upon a mostly unseen, and audibly manic, reprise of SpongeBob's cooking feat. The pilot ends with Squidward calling for Mr. Krabs in the hopes of getting SpongeBob in trouble for the presumed mess he has created.

Cast
 Tom Kenny — SpongeBob, Narrator, Gary
 Bill Fagerbakke — Patrick
 Clancy Brown — Mr. Krabs
 Rodger Bumpass — Squidward, Anchovies

Production

Development

"Help Wanted" was written by series creator Stephen Hillenburg, Derek Drymon, and Tim Hill, and the animation was directed by the show's supervising director, Alan Smart. Hillenburg also functioned as storyboard director, and Drymon worked as storyboard artist. Hillenburg initially conceived the show in February 1994 during a campfire at a surfing trip in southern Baja California in a sketchbook and began to work on it shortly after the cancellation of Rocko's Modern Life in 1996.

Hillenburg's original idea for the pitch was that the writers would write a storyboard for a possible episode and pitch it to Nickelodeon. One of the original ideas was to write an episode with SpongeBob and Squidward on a road trip, inspired by the 1989 film Powwow Highway. Eventually, the idea developed while they were working on it but Hillenburg gave up on the storyboard idea for the initial pitch. The crew resurrected the road trip idea during the first season and used a lot of the ideas for an episode called "Pizza Delivery".

Originally the character was to be named SpongeBoy and the show was to be called SpongeBoy Ahoy!. However, the Nickelodeon legal department discovered that the name SpongeBoy was already in use for a pencil product. This was discovered after voice acting for the original seven-minute pilot was recorded. In November 1997, upon finding this out, Hillenburg decided that the character's given name still had to contain "Sponge" so viewers would not mistake the character for a "Cheese Man." Hillenburg decided to use the name "SpongeBob." He chose "SquarePants" as a family name as it referred to the character's square shape, and it had a "nice ring to it".

Hillenburg and Drymon had dinner and came up with the idea for "Help Wanted" based on an experience Hillenburg had in the Boy Scouts. Hillenburg and Hill worked it into an outline. In the summer of 1997, while pitching the cartoon to Nickelodeon executives, Hillenburg donned a Hawaiian shirt, brought along an "underwater terrarium with models of the characters," and Hawaiian music to set the theme. The setup was described by Nickelodeon executive Eric Coleman as "pretty amazing". When given money and two weeks to write the pilot episode, Drymon, Hillenberg and Jennings returned with what Nickelodeon official Albie Hecht described as "a performance [I] wish [I] had on tape". Although described as stressful by creative director Derek Drymon, the pitch went "very well"; Kevin Kay and Hecht had to step outside because they were "exhausted from laughing," making the cartoonists worried. With help from Hill and art director Nick Jennings, Hillenburg finished the pitch and sold SpongeBob SquarePants to Nickelodeon. Drymon said "the network approved it—so we were ready to go."

In an interview with Cyma Zarghami, she told "their [Nickelodeon executives'] immediate reaction was to see it again, both because they liked it, and it was unlike anything they'd ever seen before." Hillenburg said the character construction in the episode was loose. But the character development was already "pretty strong."

Design
When the crew began production on the episode, they were tasked to design the stock locations where "the show would return to again and again, and in which most of the action would take place, such as the Krusty Krab and SpongeBob's pineapple house." Hillenburg had a "clear vision" of what he wanted the show to look like. The idea was "to keep everything nautical" so the crew used ropes, wooden planks, ships' wheels, netting, anchors, and boilerplate, and rivets.

The pilot and the rest of the series feature the "sky flowers" as the main background. When series background designer Kenny Pittenger was asked "What are those things?," he answered, "They function as clouds in a way, but since the show takes place underwater, they aren't really clouds." Since the show was influenced by tiki, the background painters have to use a lot of patterns. Pittenger said "So really, the sky flowers are mostly a whimsical design element that Steve [Hillenburg] came up with to evoke the look of a flower-print Hawaiian shirt—or something like that. I don't know what they are either."

Casting

While Drymon and Hill were writing the pilot, Hillenburg was also conducting auditions to find voices for the show's characters. He had created the character of SpongeBob with Tom Kenny, in which he utilised Kenny's and other people's personalities to help create its personality. Drymon said, "Tom came in a few times so we could pitch him what we were working to help him find the right voice. Tom had already worked on lots of other animated shows, and Steve wanted to find an original sounding voice." Kenny originally used the voice of SpongeBob for a very minor female alligator character named Al in Rocko's Modern Life who appeared in the episode "Dear John." Kenny forgot the voice initially, as he created it only for that single use. Hillenburg, however, remembered it when he was coming up with SpongeBob and used a video clip of the episode to remind Kenny of the voice. Kenny says that SpongeBob's high-pitched laugh was specifically aimed at being unique, stating that they wanted an annoying laugh in the tradition of Popeye and Woody Woodpecker.

Kenny also provided the voice of Gary, SpongeBob's meowing sea snail, and the narrator in the episode. According to him, "It was always Steve's intention that the narrator is a nod to his beloved Jacques Cousteau." Kenny described Cousteau's voice as "very dispassionate, very removed, very flatline, even when he’s describing something miraculous and beautiful." At first, they found that the narrator "just sounds bored," so they decided that he "has to sound a little fun and playful." Kenny said, "'Let ees the most amazing thing I have ever seen in my life.' We found that after a while we had to make the narrator a little more playful than that."

Bill Fagerbakke voiced SpongeBob's best friend, a starfish named Patrick Star, in the episode. He auditioned for the role after Kenny had been cast as SpongeBob.  Fagerbakke said, "Steve is such a lovely guy, and I had absolutely no feeling for the material whatsoever." He described his experience in the audition, saying, "I was just going in for another audition, and I had no idea what was in store there in terms of the remarkable visual wit and really the kind of endearing child-like humanity in the show. I couldn't pick that up from the audition material at all. I was just kind of perfunctorily trying to give the guy what he wanted." For the part of Squidward, Hillenburg originally had Mr. Lawrence in mind for the role. Lawrence worked with Hillenburg and Drymon before on Rocko's Modern Life, so while working on the episode, Hillenburg invited him to audition for all the characters. Drymon said, "We were showing Doug the storyboard, and he started reading back to us in his Tony the Tiger/Gregory Peck voice. It was really funny, and we wound up having SpongeBob use a deep voice when he entered the Krusty Krab for the first time." Hillenburg decided to give Lawrence the part of the series villain, Plankton, instead.

Music

The episode features the song called "Livin' in the Sunlight, Lovin' in the Moonlight" by Tiny Tim. At the point the pilot had already been completed, music editor Nick Carr was asked to retool the existing music on it. Carr said "When I first started on SpongeBob, my duties were mainly music editorial but would quickly thrust me into the composers/supervisor chair." The production team placed most of its music budget on using "Livin' in the Sunlight, Lovin' in the Moonlight", which Carr described as "a sadly familiar scenario with most cartoons for television. By the time it comes to consider the music, the budget is blown."

The idea of using "Livin' in the Sunlight, Lovin' in the Moonlight" originated when someone sent Hillenburg a tape with "a bunch of music." While the writers were developing the show outside Nickelodeon, Hillenburg played the song for Drymon as an example of the enthusiasm he was looking for. When it came time to write the pilot, they had the idea to use the song in the third act. The crew eventually got the rights to use the song for the pilot, but all they had was "the crummy copy on Steve's old tape." The writers were able to use the music, as one of the women who worked at Nickelodeon at the time "knew somebody somewhere who had access to something," and she brought in a copy of the song on CD. Drymon said "We were fortunate that she had the contact; otherwise we wouldn't have been able to use it. The sad part was Tiny Tim died right around the time we were writing the pilot, so he never knew we used his song."

Jeff Hutchins was with Hillenburg in Rocko's Modern Life working on animation sound. Hutchins was approached by Hillenburg to do music for the show. He was asked for "20 things, like an ocean liner horn," and Hutchins knew he had the music Hillenburg was looking for. Hutchins said "I offered him options and, in some cases, multiple choices. We agreed to meet at the Warner Bros. gate near the water tower in 20 minutes." He recorded the sound to a tape and met Hillenburg by the gate. Hutchins said, "He was about as happy as you could imagine, and off he went. Next thing you know, I am working on the show." Hutchins became the regular series sound designer.

Release

Broadcast 
SpongeBob SquarePants aired its first segment, "Help Wanted", along with sister segments "Reef Blower" and "Tea at the Treedome", on May 1, 1999, following the television airing of the 1999 Kids' Choice Awards. The series later made its official debut on July 17, 1999, with the second episode "Bubblestand" and "Ripped Pants".

Home media 
Before the episode's TV debut, "Help Wanted" was included in the 1998 Best of Nicktoons VHS in its 1997 version.

"Help Wanted" was excluded in the SpongeBob SquarePants: The Complete First Season DVD, featuring the rest of the first-season episodes, since its release on October 28, 2003. It was not included because Nickelodeon did not want to pay Tiny Tim's estate for the DVD rights, because his music in the episode was copyrighted. Drymon said "'Help Wanted' had to be left off[...]" However, on the German release of the season one DVD, the episode "Help Wanted" actually is included. "Help Wanted" was later released on the SpongeBob SquarePants: The Complete 3rd Season DVD as a bonus feature on September 27, 2005. On September 22, 2009, "Help Wanted" was released on the SpongeBob SquarePants: The First 100 Episodes DVD, alongside all the episodes of seasons one through five. The First 100 Episodes DVD included a special feature called "Help Wanted" the Seven Seas Edition that featured "Help Wanted" in numerous languages. The episode "Help Wanted" was also a bonus feature in the series DVD called SpongeBob SquarePants: 10 Happiest Moments that was released on September 14, 2010. On April 29, 2014, "Help Wanted" was released on the "SpongeBob, You're Fired!" episode compilation DVD. Upon release, the DVD set was quickly sold out at Best Buy and was selling "briskly" at online retailers, including Amazon.com, Barnes & Noble, and Walmart.

In 2013, the series main cast members, including Tom Kenny, Clancy Brown, Rodger Bumpass, and Bill Fagerbakke, performed a live read-through of the episode during the SpongeBob event called "SpongeBob Fan Shellabration". The read-through took place on a sound effects stage at the Universal Studios Hollywood on September 7–8. The event also hosted the screening of the winning videos from the inaugural SpongeBob SquareShorts: Original Fan Tributes competition.

Reception and legacy

Upon its release, "Help Wanted" was viewed in over 2 million households. Furthermore, the episode received generally favorable reviews from media critics. Michael Cavna of The Washington Post ranked "Help Wanted" at  3 at his The Top Five SpongeBob Episodes: We Pick 'Em list. Other episodes in the list are "Band Geeks", "Ripped Pants", "Just One Bite" and "Idiot Box". Cavna rewatched the episode in 2009 and said "so much of the style and polish are already in place." Nancy Basile of the About.com said "[The] humor and optimistic essence of SpongeBob is evident even in this first episode." Maxie Zeus of Toon Zone said the episode is a "winner". In an Associated Press article, Frazier Moore lauded the featured song in the episode called "Livin' in the Sunlight, Lovin' in the Moonlight" calling it the "kookie part."

Writer Kent Osborne considers the episode one of his favorite episodes and calls it "really good". Eric Coleman, vice president of animation development and production at Nickelodeon, lauded the episode and called it "one of the best pilots" because "it conveys a strong personality."

In a DVD review of the first season, Jason Bovberg of the DVD Talk was disappointed on the set, saying "Where is it? This is perhaps the only disappointment of the set. I was a little aggravated by the loooong animated menus that introduce all the characters, one by one, but it's really that missing episode that has me upset." Bovberg described the set as "annoying" for missing the episode. Bill Treadway of the DVD Verdict, on the exclusion of the episode on the DVD, said "It's a small flaw in an otherwise top-notch package." In a DVD review of the third season, Bryan Pope of the DVD Verdict, on the episode as a bonus feature, said "The most intriguing extra is the series' pilot episode, 'Help Wanted'." He asked in his review "Why to release it now instead of in its natural spot with the first season?" In the end, he said, "Regardless, SpongeBob completists will cherish its inclusion here."

References

Further reading

External links

 

American television series premieres
1999 American television episodes
SpongeBob SquarePants episodes